R. Avudaiyappan is an Indian politician and former speaker of Tamil Nadu Assembly. He was elected to the Tamil Nadu legislative assembly as a Dravida Munnetra Kazhagam candidate from Ambasamudram constituency in 1996 and 2006 elections.

In 2011 Tamil Nadu State Assembly election also he contested from Ambasamudram Constituency. However, he lost to E.Subaya (AIADMK).
In 2016 election he contested and lost to Murugaiah pandian of AIADMK.
He served as speaker of Tamil Nadu state assembly from 2006 to 2011.

References 

Dravida Munnetra Kazhagam politicians
Living people
Speakers of the Tamil Nadu Legislative Assembly
Tamil Nadu MLAs 1996–2001
Tamil Nadu MLAs 2006–2011
Year of birth missing (living people)